Ailuropoda is the only extant genus in the ursid (bear) subfamily Ailuropodinae. It contains one living and three fossil species of panda.

Only one species—Ailuropoda melanoleuca—currently exists; the other three species are prehistoric chronospecies. Despite its taxonomic classification as a carnivoran, the giant panda has a diet that is primarily herbivorous, which consists almost exclusively of bamboo.

Giant pandas have descended from Ailurarctos, which lived during the late Miocene.

Etymology

From Greek   "cat" +   "foot" (gen. sg.). Unlike most bears, giant pandas do not have round pupils, but instead have vertical slits, similar to those of cats. This has not only inspired the scientific name, but in Chinese the giant panda is called "large bear cat" and in Standard Tibetan, "cat bear".

Classification
†Ailuropoda microta Pei, 1962 (late Pliocene)
†Ailuropoda wulingshanensis Wang et alii. 1982 (late Pliocene - early Pleistocene)
†Ailuropoda baconi (Woodward 1915) (Pleistocene)
Ailuropoda melanoleuca (giant panda) (David, 1869)
Ailuropoda melanoleuca melanoleuca (David, 1869)
Ailuropoda melanoleuca qinlingensis Wan Q.H., Wu H. et Fang S.G., 2005

Other pandas
The red, or lesser, panda (Ailurus fulgens) was formerly considered closely related to the giant panda. It is no longer considered a bear, however, and is now classified as the sole living representative of a different carnivore family (Ailuridae).

References

Bears
Mammal genera
Mammal genera with one living species
Extant Pliocene first appearances
Taxa named by Henri Milne-Edwards